The boxing tournaments at the 2002 Commonwealth Games in Manchester took place from July 26 to August 3 at the Forum Centre, and the Manchester Evening News Arena.

Competition format

The events competed in were as follows:

Competition schedule

Source:

Participation

Participating nations

Medal summary

Medal table

 Host nation (England)

See also
Boxing at the 1930 British Empire Games
Boxing at the 1998 Commonwealth Games
Boxing at the Commonwealth Games

References

 
2002 Commonwealth Games events
Boxing at the Commonwealth Games
2002 in boxing
Boxing in England
International boxing competitions hosted by the United Kingdom